Pterokrohniidae is a family of sagittoideans in the order Aphragmophora. I consists of a single genus, Pterokrohnia Srinivasan, 1986, which consists of a single species, Pterokrohnia arabica Srinavasan, 1986.

References

Chaetognatha
Monotypic protostome genera